Donald Large may refer to:
Lofty Large (Donald Large, 1930–2006), former SAS soldier and author